This is a list of butterflies in Sweden.

Papilionidae
 Old World swallowtail, Papilio machaon
 Mountain Apollo, Parnassius apollo
 Clouded Apollo, Parnassius mnemosyne

Pieridae
 Black-veined white, Aporia crataegi
 Large white, Pieris brassicae
 Small white, Pieris rapae
 Green-veined white, Pieris napi
 Eastern Bath white, Pontia edusa
 Orange tip, Anthocharis cardamines
 Pale Arctic clouded yellow, Colias nastes
 Moorland clouded yellow, Colias palaeno
 Northern clouded yellow, Colias hecla
 Pale clouded yellow, Colias hyale
 Clouded yellow, Colias crocea
 Brimstone, Gonepteryx rhamni
 Wood white, Leptidea sinapis
 Réal's wood white, Leptidea reali

Lycaenidae
 Brown hairstreak, Thecla betulae
 Purple hairstreak, Neozephyrus quercus
 Ilex hairstreak, Satyrium ilicis
 White-letter hairstreak, Satyrium w-album
 Black hairstreak, Satyrium pruni
 Green hairstreak, Callophrys rubi
 Violet copper, Lycaena helle
 Small copper, Lycaena phlaeas
 Scarce copper, Lycaena virgaureae
 Purple-edged copper, Lycaena hippothoe
 Little blue, Cupido minimus
 Holly blue, Celastrina argiolus
 Green-underside blue, Glaucopsyche alexis
 Alcon blue, Phengaris alcon
 Large blue, Phengaris arion
 Checkered blue, Scolitantides orion
 Silver-studded blue, Plebejus argus
 Idas blue, Plebejus idas
 Reverdin's blue, Plebeius argyrognomon
 Geranium argus, Eumedonia eumedon
 Mountain argus, Aricia artaxerxes
 Silvery argus, Aricia nicias
 Cranberry blue, Agriades optilete
 Alpine blue, Agriades orbitulus
 Glandon blue, Agriades glandon
 Mazarine blue, Cyaniris semiargus
 Amanda's blue, Polyommatus amandus
 Turquoise blue, Polyommatus dorylas
 Common blue, Polyommatus icarus

Riodinidae
 Duke of Burgundy, Hamearis lucina

Nymphalidae
 Purple emperor, Apatura iris
 Poplar admiral, Limenitis populi
 Large tortoiseshell, Nymphalis polychloros
 Camberwell beauty, Nymphalis antiopa
 Red admiral, Vanessa atalanta
 Painted lady, Vanessa cardui
 Peacock butterfly, Aglais io
 Small tortoiseshell, Aglais urticae
 Comma butterfly, Polygonia c-album
 Map butterfly, Araschnia levana
 Silver-washed fritillary, Argynnis paphia
 Pallas's fritillary, Argynnis laodice
 Dark green fritillary, Speyeria aglaja
 High brown fritillary, Fabriciana adippe
 Niobe fritillary, Fabriciana niobe
 Queen of Spain fritillary, Issoria lathonia
 Lesser marbled fritillary, Brenthis ino
 Mountain fritillary, Boloria napaea
 Cranberry fritillary, Boloria aquilonaris
 Bog fritillary, Boloria eunomia
 Pearl-bordered fritillary, Boloria euphrosyne
 Small pearl-bordered fritillary, Boloria selene
 Arctic fritillary, Boloria chariclea
 Frejya's fritillary, Boloria freija
 Polar fritillary, Boloria polaris
 Thor's fritillary, Boloria thore
 Frigga's fritillary, Boloria frigga
 Dusky-winged fritillary, Boloria improba
 Glanville fritillary, Melitaea cinxia
 False heath fritillary, Melitaea diamina
 Heath fritillary, Melitaea athalia
 Assmann's fritillary, Melitaea britomartis
 Scarce fritillary, Euphydryas maturna
 Lappland fritillary, Euphydryas iduna
 Marsh fritillary, Euphydryas aurinia
 Grayling, Hipparchia semele
 Norse grayling, Oeneis norna
 Arctic grayling, Oeneis bore
 Baltic grayling, Oeneis jutta
 Arran brown, Erebia ligea
 Lapland ringlet, Erebia embla
 Arctic ringlet, Erebia disa
 Dewy ringlet, Erebia pandrose
 Meadow brown, Maniola jurtina
 Ringlet, Aphantopus hyperantus
 Large heath, Coenonympha tullia
 Small heath, Coenonympha pamphilus
 Pearly heath, Coenonympha arcania
 Scarce heath, Coenonympha hero
 Speckled wood, Pararge aegeria
 Wall brown, Lasiommata megera
 Large wall brown, Lasiommata maera
 Northern wall brown, Lasiommata petropolitana
 Woodland brown, Lopinga achine

Hesperiidae
 Grizzled skipper, Pyrgus malvae
 Large grizzled skipper, Pyrgus alveus
 Oberthür's grizzled skipper, Pyrgus armoricanus
 Alpine grizzled skipper, Pyrgus andromedae
 Northern grizzled skipper, Pyrgus centaureae
 Dingy skipper, Erynnis tages
 Large checkered skipper, Heteropterus morpheus
 Checkered skipper, Carterocephalus palaemon
 Northern checkered skipper, Carterocephalus silvicola
 Essex skipper, Thymelicus lineola
 Silver-spotted skipper, Hesperia comma
 Large skipper, Ochlodes sylvanus

References

See also
List of moths of Sweden

Lists of butterflies by location
Sweden
Butterflies by country
Sweden, butterflies
Butterflies